Charles Windeyer (1 July 1780 – 30 January 1855) was an Australian magistrate who held a variety of public positions and was later appointed by Governor George Gipps as the first Mayor of Sydney.  He was the father of barrister and politician Richard Windeyer and grandfather of politician and judge William Charles Windeyer.

References

1780 births
1855 deaths
Mayors and Lord Mayors of Sydney
Australian people of Swiss-German descent
19th-century Australian politicians